Claudia Silvana Velásquez Ponzoni (born September 30, 1975) is a retired female breaststroke swimmer from Peru. She represented her native country at the 1992 Summer Olympics in Barcelona, Spain. She finished in 39th (100 m breaststroke) and in 37th place (200 m breaststroke).

References
 Profile

1975 births
Living people
Peruvian female breaststroke swimmers
Swimmers at the 1992 Summer Olympics
Olympic swimmers of Peru
20th-century Peruvian women